Motu Iti (lit. Little Island) may refer to:
Motu Iti (Marquesas Islands), or Hatu Iti, a small island in the northern Marquesas Islands
Motu Iti (Rapa Nui), a small islet near Easter Island
Motu Iti (Society Islands), or Tupai, a small island in the Leeward Society Islands